The Monaco ePrix is a recurring automobile race of the Formula E World Championship which takes place in Monte Carlo, Monaco.

Circuit

On 18 September 2014 it was announced that Formula E would be racing on a shorter version of the original Monaco Grand Prix circuit for the 2014–15 season. This version misses out the hill, Casino square, the iconic hairpin, the famous tunnel and the chicane. However, in the 2020–21 season, the ePrix will be held on the traditional full-length Monaco circuit.

Monaco was not scheduled to be on the calendar for the second season of Formula E because it takes the slot on the calendar filled by the Historic Grand Prix at Monaco every other year. Series boss Alejandro Agag revealed that a race in Paris replaced the Monaco ePrix for 2016, but Monaco was held again in the 2016–17 season.

In 2020, virtual version of the track hosted the first ever Race At Home series due to travelling and restrictions around mass gatherings from 2020 Coronavirus pandemic. The race is a non-scoring preseason race. It then made a return on Round 3, where the damage level increased.

On 16 April 2021, it was announced that a new track layout will be used for 2021 Monaco ePrix, the layout is similar to the Formula One layout, just there will be differences on the T1 (Sainte Devote) and T9 (Nouvelle Chicane). However, on the week of Monaco ePrix, it was decided to use T1 like the Formula One circuit in order to regenerate more energy by braking.

In 2022, Grand Prix layout was used instead of the Formula E layout.

Results

Repeat winners (drivers)

References

 
Monaco
Sport in Monte Carlo
Sports competitions in Monaco
Recurring sporting events established in 2015
2015 establishments in Monaco